Lola is an unincorporated community in Livingston County, Kentucky, United States.

In 1881, Robert P. Mitchell established a post office and named it for his daughter, Lola.

References

Unincorporated communities in Livingston County, Kentucky
Unincorporated communities in Kentucky